PP-288 Dera Ghazi Khan-I is a Constituency of Provincial Assembly of Punjab.

General elections 2013

General elections 2008

See also
 PP-287 Taunsa-cum-Dera Ghazi Khan
 PP-289 Dera Ghazi Khan-II

References

External links
 Election commission Pakistan's official website
 Awazoday.com check result
 Official Website of Government of Punjab

Provincial constituencies of Punjab, Pakistan